Gadwal Vijayalakshmi is an Indian-born politician serving as the current mayor of Greater Hyderabad Municipal Corporation (GHMC) since 11 February 2021. A former American citizen, she emigrated back to India to join politics and went on to become the fifth woman mayor of Hyderabad and the first post formation of the state of Telangana. She is a member of Bharat Rashtra Samithi (BRS) party based in Telangana.

Early life
Gadwal Vijayalakshmi is born to politician K. Keshava Rao and his wife Vasantha Kumar. Rao is a politician from Telangana Rashtra Samithi (TRS) party and Member of Parliament who represented Andhra Pradesh in the Rajya Sabha, the upper house of the Indian Parliament.

Vijayalakshmi married Bobby Reddy whom she met at ICRISAT tennis club.

Education

Vijayalakshmi completed her secondary school from Holy Mary School, Hyderabad and Junior College from Reddy women's college, Hyderabad, Bachelors in Journalism from Bharatiya Vidya Bhavan and Bachelor of Laws (LLB) from Sultan-ul-Uloom Law College, Hyderabad.

She emigrated to the United States and obtained the US green card in 1988 following which she got married and settled there. Later, she took American citizenship in 1999. While staying in North Carolina, United States Gadwal Vijayalakshmi worked at Duke University, cardiology department as research scholar.

Political career
In the year 2004, she emigrated back to India and eventually left her American citizenship in 2009 to join politics. In 2016 she contested as a corporator from the TRS party and won. In 2020 she contested from Banjara Hills ward as a corporator and won. On 11 February 2021, she is elected as the first woman Mayor after the formation of Telangana state in 2014.

References

External links

 

Living people
1964 births
Politicians from Hyderabad, India
Telangana politicians
Telugu politicians
Telangana Rashtra Samithi politicians
Women in Telangana politics
Mayors of Hyderabad, India
Women mayors of places in Telangana
Bharatiya Vidya Bhavan schools alumni
Indian emigrants to the United States
Naturalized citizens of the United States
American people of Telugu descent
Duke University alumni
Women in North Carolina politics
American politicians of Indian descent
Former United States citizens
People with acquired Indian citizenship
American emigrants to India
21st-century Indian women
21st-century Indian politicians
21st-century Indian women politicians
21st-century American women politicians
21st-century American politicians